Kazakhstan has a well-articulated culture based on the nomadic pastoral economy of the inhabitants. Islam was introduced to Kazakhstan in the 7th to 12th centuries. Besides lamb, many other traditional foods retain symbolic value. Kazakh culture is largely influenced by the Turkic nomadic lifestyle. It also seems to be strongly influenced by the nomadic Scythians. 

Because animal husbandry was central to the Kazakhs' traditional lifestyle, most of their nomadic practices and customs relate in some way to livestock. Traditional curses and blessings invoked disease or fertility among animals, and good manners required that a person ask first about the health of a man's livestock when greeting him and only afterward inquire about the human aspects of his life.

The traditional Kazakh dwelling is the yurt, a tent consisting of a flexible framework of willow wood covered with varying thicknesses of felt. The open top permits smoke from the central hearth to escape; temperature and draft can be controlled by a flap that increases or decreases the size of the opening. A properly constructed yurt can be cooled in summer and warmed in winter, and it can be disassembled or set up in less than an hour. The interior of the yurt has ritual significance; the right side is generally reserved for men and the left for women. Yurts are also frequently used as a decorative motif in restaurants and other public buildings.

Modern Influences
Today's Kazakhstan is a modern culture, thriving in the post-Soviet era. The traditional Kazakh lifestyle has blended with influences from Western societies, as well as those from Kazakhstan's Russian and Chinese neighbors.

Religion

Islam is the largest religion in Kazakhstan, followed by Russian Orthodox Christianity. By tradition the Kazakhs are Sunni Muslims, and the Russians are Russian Orthodox. Approximately 70% of the population is Muslim. The majority are Sunni of the Hanafi school, including ethnic Kazakhs, who constitute about 60% of the population, as well as by ethnic Uzbeks, Uighurs, and Tatars. Less than 25% of the population is Russian Orthodox, including ethnic Russians, Ukrainians, and Belarusians. Other religious groups include Judaism, the Baháʼí Faith, Hare Krishnas, Buddhism, and the Church of Jesus Christ of Latter-day Saints.

Cuisine

Traditional Kazakh cuisine revolves around lamb and horse meat, as well as a variety of dairy milk products. For hundreds of years, Kazakhs were herders who raised fat-tailed sheep, Bactrian camels, and horses, relying on these animals for transportation, clothing, and food. The cooking techniques and major ingredients have been strongly influenced by the nation's nomadic way of life. For example, most cooking techniques are aimed at long-term preservation of food. There is a large practice of salting and drying meat so that it will last, and there is a preference for sour milk, as it is easier to save in a nomadic lifestyle. 

In recent years, there has been an influx of young westernised Kazakh chefs into the heart of Nur-Sultan, including the now famous Rania Ahmed who spent her early years training in West London's Michelin Star restaurants. This has resulted in a new breed of cuisine which blends traditional savoury Kazakh dishes with European fast food, such as betinjantabs, proving very popular with younger generations.

Besbarmak, a dish consisting of boiled horse or lamb meat, is the most popular Kazakh dish. Besbarmak is usually eaten with a boiled pasta sheet, and a meat broth called shorpa, and is traditionally served in Kazakh bowls called kese. Other popular meat dishes are kazy (which is a horse meat sausage that only the wealthy could afford), shuzhuk (horse meat sausages), kuyrdak (also spelled kuirdak, a dish made from roasted horse, sheep, or cow offal, such as heart, liver, kidneys, and other organs, diced and served with onions and peppers), and various horse delicacies, such as zhal (smoked lard from horse's neck) and zhaya (salted and smoked meat from horse's hip and hind leg). Pilaf (palaw) is the most common Kazakh rice dish, with vegetables (carrots, onions, and/or garlic) and chunks of meat. The national drinks are kumys (fermented mare's milk) and tea.

Traditions 
Kazakhs are known for their hospitality, and so many Kazakh traditions are based on this ethnic feature. Some traditions have been lost, but some have been rediscovered. Below are some of the traditions that continue to play a role in the modern Kazakh society: 

Konakasy (Kazakh: қонақасы; "konak" - guest, "as" - food) -  a tradition to welcome a guest and make his stay as enjoyable as one can by providing food, lodge, entertainment. Depending on the circumstances under which a guest had come from, he is either called "arnayy konak" (Kazakh: арнайы қонақ) - a specially invited guest, "kudayy konak" (Kazakh: құдайы қонақ) - a casual traveller, or "kydyrma konak" (Kazakh: қыдырма қонақ) - an unexpected visitor. 

Korimdik (Kazakh: көрімдік; "koru" - to see) - a tradition of presenting a person with a gift to congratulate him on a gain in his life. The custom is called korimdik, if a gain is related to a person or an animal (e.g. seeing a person's daughter-in-law or a newborn animal for the first time), and baygazy (Kazakh: байғазы), if the gain is material. 

Shashu (Kazakh: шашу - to scatter) - a tradition to shower heroes of an occasion with sweets during some festivity. Kazakhs believe that collected delights bring luck. 

Bata (Kazakh: бата - blessing) - a form of poetic art, typically given by the most respected or the eldest person to express gratitude for the provided hospitality, give blessing to a person who is about to enter a new phase in life, go through a challenging experience or travel. 

Tusau kesu (Kazakh: тұсау кесу - to cut ties) - a tradition to celebrate the first attempts of a child to walk. The legs of a child are tied with a string of white and black colors symbolizing the good and the bad in life. The tie is then cut by a female relative who is energetic and lively in nature, so that the child acquires her qualities. After the string has been cut, it is burnt. 

Kyz uzatu (Kazakh: қыз ұзату) - the first wedding party organized by the parents of a bride. The literal translation is "to see off a daughter". 

Betashar (Kazakh: беташар; "bet" - face, "ashu" - to open) - the custom (often done at the wedding) to lift a veil from the face of a bride. Today it the mullah who is invited to perform an improvised song, in which he mentions relatives of the groom. During his performance, a bride has to bow every time she hears a name. After the song, the mother of the groom lifts the veil. 

Shildehana (Kazakh: шілдехана) - celebration of a birth of a child. 

Suinshi (Kazakh: сүйінші) -  a tradition to give present to someone who has brought good news.

Languages

The official language is Kazakh, a Turkic language closely related to Nogai and Karakalpak. Another widely spoken language is Russian. The recent language policy suggests trilingualism as an important factor for future development of the country.

Literature
 

Abay Qunanbayuli was a great Kazakh poet, composer and philosopher.

Art 
Each year Kazakh artisans participate in the "Sheber" competition. The competition is part of the program "Development of crafts and the revival of folk arts and crafts in Kazakhstan", which began in 2006 to increase the competitiveness of Kazakh artisans’ products domestically and internationally. This program is conducted by the Union of Artisans of Kazakhstan, "Chevron", the Eurasia Foundation of Central Asia, Kazakh Ministry of Culture and Information and the UNESCO Cluster Office in Almaty.

Movies

In September 2006, the government announced that it is funding distribution of a multimillion-dollar movie called Nomad, about the new-created by Kazakhstan government history of the nation. The movie started in 2003, and was plagued with multiple development problems, finally released in 2006.

Since that time such movies like Mongol, Tulpan, and Kelin have been released. All three films were submitted for the Academy Award for the Best Foreign Languages Film. Kelin, a movie without dialogue or speech, made the shortlist of the 1982 Academy Awards.

Music

Magic Songs of the Eternal Steppe
Magic Songs of the Eternal Steppe is a series of concerts at Carnegie Hall and The Kennedy Center in celebration of Kazakhstan Cultural Days in the United States. The concerts feature Kazakh folk music and Western classic masterpieces as well as American songs performed by the Kazakh National Kurmangazy Orchestra of Folk Instruments, Kazakh National Baikadamov Choir and a group of  Kazakh soloists.

The Symphony Orchestra of the Kurmangazy Kazakh National Conservatory
Symphony Orchestra of the Kurmangazy Kazakh National Conservatory was founded in 1947. The first leader of the orchestra was Professor K. Babayev. The Orchestra has a vast repertoire spanning Haydn, Mozart, Beethoven, Schubert, Brahms, Liszt, Saint-Saens, Bizet, Ravel, Franck, Mahler, Orff, Tchaikovsky, Rachmaninoff, Mussorgsky, Shostakovich, and many others.

Sports

Kazakhstan has cultivated a strong interest in sports, physical education, and extracurricular activities. Kazakhstan has achieved some success in international competitions in weightlifting, ice hockey, and boxing. Kazakhstan won eight medals in the 2004 Summer Olympics, the largest tally for any nation in Central Asia.

Football is the most popular sport in Kazakhstan. The Football Federation of Kazakhstan (FFK) is the sport's national governing body. The FFK organises the men's, women's, and futsal national teams. The Kazakhstan Super League is the top-level competition for the sport in the country.

Road cycling is Kazakhstan's most successful sport. Many professional cyclists that compete on the European circuit come from Kazakhstan. Most notable is Alexander Vinokourov, whose achievements include two Paris–Nice victories (2002, 2003), third place in the 2003 Tour de France, and first place in the 2003 Amstel Gold Race. Vinokourov leads , which is supported by a coalition of Kazakh companies. This team is registered as a UCI ProTeam and competes in major races, including the Tour de France.

Rugby union is a popular sport in Kazakhstan, with over 10,000 fans consistently turning up to watch the Kazakhstan national rugby union team play. Recent big wins over Sri Lanka and the Arabian Gulf Rugby Team have given the Kazakhstan side the reason to believe that they could have been contenders to qualify for the 2011 Rugby World Cup. Kazakhstan has yet to qualify for the Rugby World Cup tournament.

Ruhani Zhangyru
President Nursultan Nazarbayev outlined six specific projects designed to start the spiritual modernisation of Kazakhstan in his keynote article “Course towards the Future: Modernisation of Kazakhstan's Identity," which was released in April 2017. The projects include the following:
 a step-by-step transition of the Kazakh language to the Latin alphabet and the New Humanitarian Knowledge
 100 New Textbooks in the Kazakh Language
 Tugan Zher
 Sacred Geography of Kazakhstan
 Modern Kazakh Culture in the Global World
 100 New Faces of Kazakhstan.

The program also includes translation of the contemporary Kazakh literature and poetry into the UN's six languages. The official presentation of the Anthology took place in Almaty in April 2019.

The presentation of the Anthology translated into English was held at the British Library in London on September 25, 2019. The Cambridge University Press along with the British literary translation experts translated and published the Kazakh literature collections in English.

An important part of the program is the Seven Facets of the Great Steppe doctrine, which described by President Nazarbayev. The article described the seven facets of the Great Steppe: culture of horsemanship, ancient metallurgy of the great steppe, animal style, Golden Man, cradle of the Turkic world, the Great Silk Road and the land of apples and tulips.

See also 
 History of Kazakhstan
 Kazakh clothing

Notes

References
  - Kazakhstan
 Bruce Privratsky, Muslim Turkistan, pages 76–77

External links 
 Embassy link for further culture questions
 Message Board in Kazakh Language
 The Musagetes Civic Charitable Foundation for Culture and Humanitarian Sciences Development
 Kazakhstan: history, geography, people, culture, traditions, holiday, living, life

 

pt:Cazaquistão#Cultura